Alvin J. Clasen (November 13, 1892 – October 1, 1971) was an American politician.

Born in Milwaukee, Wisconsin,  he was the son of Charles A Clasen (1862-1944) and  Sophia (Eschenburg) Clasen (1869-1947). Clasen served in the United States Army during World War I. Clasen went to Marquette University and was a laundry operator. In 1943, Clasen served in the Wisconsin State Assembly and was a Republican. In April 1944, Clasen was elected to the Milwaukee Common Council. Clasen died in Mequon, Wisconsin and was buried at Graceland Cemetery in Milwaukee County, Wisconsin.

Notes

1892 births
1971 deaths
Politicians from Milwaukee
Marquette University alumni
Military personnel from Wisconsin
Wisconsin city council members
Republican Party members of the Wisconsin State Assembly
20th-century American politicians